Aragualna is a genus of cicadas in the family Cicadidae, found in Venezuela. There is at least one described species in Aragualna, A. plenalinea.

Aragualna is the only genus of the tribe Aragualnini.

References

Further reading

 
 
 
 
 
 
 
 

Cicadettinae
Cicadidae genera